Bazarnye Mataki (Bazarlı Matak) is a rural locality (a selo) and the administrative center of Alkeyevsky District in Tatarstan, Russia. Population:

References

Rural localities in Tatarstan
Spassky Uyezd (Kazan Governorate)